Qermezi Bolagh (also Romanized as Qermezī Bolāgh; also known as Qermez Bolāgh) is a village in Baruq Rural District, Baruq District, Miandoab County, West Azerbaijan Province, Iran. At the 2006 census, its population was 179, in 35 families.

References 

Populated places in Miandoab County